Dolichancistrus fuesslii is a species of catfish in the family Loricariidae. It is a freshwater fish native to South America, where it is known only from Colombia. The species reaches 13.1 cm (5.2 inches) in total length.

References 

Ancistrini
Catfish of South America